In mathematics, a collection of real numbers  is rationally independent if none of them can be written as a linear combination of the other numbers in the collection with rational coefficients. A collection of numbers which is not rationally independent is called rationally dependent. For instance we have the following example. 

Because if we let , then .

Formal definition

The real numbers ω1, ω2, ... , ωn are said to be rationally dependent if there exist integers k1, k2, ... , kn, not all of which are zero, such that

If such integers do not exist, then the vectors are said to be rationally independent. This condition can be reformulated as follows: ω1, ω2, ... , ωn are rationally independent if the only n-tuple of integers k1, k2, ... , kn such that

is the trivial solution in which every ki is zero.

The real numbers form a vector space over the rational numbers, and this is equivalent to the usual definition of linear independence in this vector space.

See also 
Baker's theorem
Dehn invariant
Gelfond–Schneider theorem
Hamel basis
Hodge conjecture
Lindemann–Weierstrass theorem
Linear flow on the torus
Schanuel's conjecture

Bibliography

 

Dynamical systems